Loda may refer to:
 Loda, Azerbaijan
 Loda, Illinois, United States
 Loda, West Virginia, United States
 Loda Township, Iroquois County, Illinois, United States
 Loda language, North Halmahera language of Indonesia
 Battle of Lođa, 1998 Kosovo War 
 Platypolia loda, cutworm

People
 Loda Halama (1911–1996), Polish dancer and actress
 Loda Niemirzanka (1909–1984), Polish film actress
 Beppe Loda, dj Afro/cosmic music
 Nicola Loda (born 1971), Italian racing cyclist
 Loda, a former professional Dota 2 player and esports manager for Alliance

Polish feminine given names